St. Thomas Episcopal Church is a historic church in Alexandria Township, Hunterdon County, New Jersey near Pittstown and is one of the oldest churches in the county.  The present church replaced a log or frame church that was built as early as the 1720s.  That church was replaced in 1768 by the present church's stone walls, though the church was not completed until after the American Revolution, c. 1790. It was added to the National Register of Historic Places on July 21, 1977, for its significance in architecture and religion.  The church was featured as a set in Sarah Jessica Parker's movie debut, the 1983 film Somewhere Tomorrow.

Gallery

See also
National Register of Historic Places listings in Hunterdon County, New Jersey

References

External links 
 
 

Churches completed in 1790
18th-century Episcopal church buildings
Episcopal church buildings in New Jersey
Churches on the National Register of Historic Places in New Jersey
Gothic Revival church buildings in New Jersey
National Register of Historic Places in Hunterdon County, New Jersey
New Jersey Register of Historic Places
Churches in Hunterdon County, New Jersey
1790 establishments in New Jersey
Stone churches in New Jersey